Harald Anton "Toni" Schumacher (born 6 March 1954) is a German former professional footballer who played as a goalkeeper. At club level, he won a Bundesliga title and three DFB-Pokal titles with 1. FC Köln. At international level, he represented West Germany. Schumacher won the 1980 European Championship and lost two World Cup finals, in 1982 and 1986. In the 1982 FIFA World Cup semi-final, he controversially collided with and seriously injured French defender Patrick Battiston. Schumacher was voted German Footballer of the Year in 1984 and 1986. Since April 2012, he has served as vice president at 1. FC Köln.

Club career
Schumacher made his first-team debut with 1. FC Köln at the age of 19. He played for the club from 1972 to 1987, including in 213 consecutive Bundesliga matches from 1977 to 1983. For most of those years, until well into the mid-1980s, he was widely considered one of the world's top goalkeepers, and he was the automatic first-choice goalkeeper for his country. He backstopped Köln to the double in 1978, winning the Bundesliga title (ahead of Borussia Mönchengladbach on goal difference) and the DFB-Pokal (defeated Fortuna Düsseldorf). The year before he had led Köln to a DFB-Pokal victory (against Hertha BSC in the final), the club's first major trophy win in nine years. He appeared in two other DFB-Pokal finals, in 1980 (lost to Fortuna Düsseldorf) and 1983 (defeated Fortuna Köln). Schumacher was voted German Footballer of the Year twice, in 1984 and 1986, by the nation's football journalists.

International career
Schumacher played 76 international matches for West Germany between 1979 and 1986, including 15 World Cup qualifying matches and 14 World Cup matches. He won the 1980 European Championship (defeated Belgium 2–1 in the final) and lost two World Cup finals, in 1982 (to Italy, 3–1) and 1986 (to Argentina, 3–2). In the 1982 tournament, in the controversial semi-final against France, he saved two penalty kicks in the post-extra time shootout, which West Germany ultimately won. In the 1986 quarter-final against tournament hosts, Mexico, he saved two of the three shootout penalties he faced, enabling West Germany to advance.

Controversy at 1982 World Cup

Schumacher was involved in a collision with a French defender, substitute Patrick Battiston, in the semi-final of the 1982 World Cup. Battiston and Schumacher were both sprinting towards a long through ball pass from Michel Platini. Battiston managed to reach the ball first and flicked it up and to the side of the approaching Schumacher. Schumacher leapt into the air as the ball sailed past him, ultimately wide of the goal. Schumacher, still in the air, collided with Battiston. The resulting contact left Battiston unconscious, later slipping into a coma. Schumacher has always denied any foul intention regarding the incident, saying that he was simply going for the ball, as a goalkeeper is entitled to do. Others have alleged that he intentionally collided with Battiston. Battiston also lost two teeth and had three cracked ribs. He received oxygen on the pitch. Michel Platini later said that he thought Battiston had died, because "he had no pulse and looked pale". The Dutch referee Charles Corver did not award a penalty for the incident. Schumacher proceeded to take the goal kick and play resumed. West Germany would eventually go on to win the game on penalty kicks after the match was tied at 3–3.

Schumacher caused more controversy after the game with his response to news that Battiston had lost two teeth: "If that's all that's wrong, tell him I'll pay for the crowns."

Schumacher did visit Battiston in the hospital, and though the Frenchman felt his apology at the time was insincere, Battiston admitted that he had forgiven him by the time the two countries faced each other four years later in yet another World Cup semifinal. That match ended in a 2–0 victory for West Germany.

A French newspaper poll asked which was the least popular man in France, and Schumacher beat Adolf Hitler into second.

When West Germany and France met again in World Cup 1986, Battiston said that the incident was "forgiven and forgotten". However, he said that he was wary of getting "close to Schumacher" and said that he would hold a distance of at least 40 meters from the West German goalkeeper. Schumacher would mostly refrain from commenting on the incident.

Coaching career
As coach of SC Fortuna Köln he was sacked at half time by club chairman Jean Löring when his club was 0–2 behind against Waldhof Mannheim in December 1999.

Autobiography
In 1987, Schumacher's autobiography Anpfiff ("kick-off") was published in various countries, including France, where there was interest in Schumacher's comments on the Battiston incident. Schumacher maintained that his actions did not constitute a foul and that he was only trying to get the ball. He said that he did not go over to check on Battiston's condition because several French players were standing around Battiston and making threatening gestures in his direction.

The book also included accounts of alleged improprieties by German football players, including substance abuse. This resulted in Schumacher's exclusion from the German national team and his long-term Bundesliga club, 1. FC Köln.

Career statistics
Ref.

Honours
1. FC Köln
 Bundesliga: 1977–78
 DFB-Pokal: 1976–77, 1977–78, 1982–83

Borussia Dortmund
 Bundesliga: 1995–96

Fenerbahçe
 1.Lig: 1988–89

Germany
 FIFA World Cup runner-up: 1982, 1986
 UEFA European Champion: 1980

Individual
 German Footballer of the Year: 1984, 1986
 UEFA European Championship Team of the Tournament: 1984
 FIFA World Cup Silver Ball: 1986
 Turkish Footballer of the Year: 1988, 1989

References

External links

Detail of international matches, by RSSSF
Leverkusen who's who
Interview with the German magazine "STERN"

1954 births
Living people
People from Düren
Sportspeople from Cologne (region)
German expatriate footballers
German footballers
Germany international footballers
Germany B international footballers
Association football goalkeepers
1. FC Köln players
FC Schalke 04 players
FC Bayern Munich footballers
Borussia Dortmund players
Fenerbahçe S.K. footballers
UEFA Euro 1980 players
1982 FIFA World Cup players
UEFA Euro 1984 players
1986 FIFA World Cup players
UEFA European Championship-winning players
Bundesliga players
Süper Lig players
Expatriate footballers in Turkey
SC Fortuna Köln managers
Footballers from North Rhine-Westphalia
German football managers
West German footballers